The Association of Tennis Professionals (ATP) World Tour is the elite professional tennis circuit organized by the ATP. The 2010 ATP World Tour calendar comprises the Grand Slam tournaments (supervised by the International Tennis Federation (ITF)), the ATP World Tour Masters 1000, the ATP World Tour 500 series, the ATP World Tour 250 series, the ATP World Team Championship, the Davis Cup (organized by the ITF), and the ATP World Tour Finals. Also included in the 2010 calendar is the Hopman Cup, which does not distribute ranking points, and is organized by the ITF.

Schedule
This is the complete schedule of events on the 2010 calendar, with player progression documented from the quarterfinals stage.

Key

January

February

March

April

May

June

July

August

September

October

November

Statistical information

These tables present the number of singles (S), doubles (D), and mixed doubles (X) titles won by each player and each nation during the season, within all the tournament categories of the 2010 ATP World Tour: the Grand Slam tournaments, the ATP World Tour Finals, the ATP World Tour Masters 1000, the ATP World Tour 500 series, and the ATP World Tour 250 series. The players/nations are sorted by: 1) total number of titles (a doubles title won by two players representing the same nation counts as only one win for the nation); 2) cumulated importance of those titles (one Grand Slam win equalling two Masters 1000 wins, one ATP World Tour Finals win equalling one-and-a-half Masters 1000 win, one Masters 1000 win equalling two 500 events wins, one 500 event win equalling two 250 events wins); 3) a singles > doubles > mixed doubles hierarchy; 4) alphabetical order (by family names for players).

Key

Titles won by player

Titles won by nation

Titles information

The following players won their first main circuit title in singles, doubles, or mixed doubles:
Singles
 John Isner – Auckland (singles)
 Ernests Gulbis – Delray Beach (singles)
 Andrey Golubev – Hamburg (singles)
 Viktor Troicki – Moscow (singles)
 Mikhail Kukushkin – St. Petersburg (singles)

Doubles
 Jérémy Chardy – Brisbane (doubles)
 Guillermo García López – Doha (doubles)
 Marcus Daniell – Auckland (doubles)
 Horia Tecău – Auckland (doubles)
 Aisam-ul-Haq Qureshi – Johannesburg (doubles)
 Philipp Petzschner – Zagreb (doubles)
 Sam Querrey – San Jose (doubles)
 Horacio Zeballos – Buenos Aires (doubles)
 Santiago González – Belgrade (doubles)
 Travis Rettenmaier – Belgrade (doubles)
 David Marrero – Estoril (doubles)
 Novak Djokovic – London (doubles)
 Carlos Berlocq – Stuttgart (doubles)
 Johan Brunström – Gstaad (doubles)
 Dustin Brown – Metz (doubles)
 Viktor Troicki – Bangkok (doubles)
 Jean-Julien Rojer – Tokyo (doubles)
 Igor Kunitsyn – Moscow (doubles)
 Andy Murray – Valencia (doubles)

The following players defended a main circuit title in singles, doubles, or mixed doubles:
 Marc Gicquel – Brisbane (doubles)
 Marin Čilić – Chennai (singles), Zagreb (singles)
 Bob Bryan – Australian Open (doubles) , Delray Beach (doubles), Houston (doubles), Los Angeles (doubles), Beijing (doubles)
 Mike Bryan – Australian Open (doubles) , Delray Beach (doubles), Houston (doubles), Los Angeles (doubles), Beijing (doubles)
 Daniel Nestor – Rotterdam (doubles), Monte Carlo (doubles), Barcelona (doubles)
 Nenad Zimonjić – Rotterdam (doubles), Monte Carlo (doubles), Barcelona (doubles)
 Marcel Granollers – Costa do Sauípe (doubles)
 Michaël Llodra – Marseille (doubles)
 Novak Djokovic – Dubai (singles), Beijing (singles)
 Rafael Nadal – Monte Carlo (singles), Rome (singles)
 Albert Montañés – Estoril (singles)
 Mariusz Fyrstenberg – Eastbourne (doubles)
 Marcin Matkowski – Eastbourne (doubles)
 Sam Querrey – Los Angeles (singles)
 Andy Murray – Toronto (singles)
 Roger Federer – Cincinnati (singles)
 Jürgen Melzer – Vienna (singles)

Rankings
These are the ATP rankings of the top twenty singles players, doubles players, and the top ten doubles teams on the ATP Tour, at the end of the 2009 ATP World Tour, and of the 2010 season, with number of rankings points, number of tournaments played, year-end ranking in 2009, highest and lowest position during the season (for singles and doubles individual only, as doubles team rankings are not calculated over a rolling year-to-date system), and number of spots gained or lost from the 2009 to the 2010 year-end rankings.

Singles

Number 1 ranking

Doubles (Individual)

Doubles (Team)

Prize money leaders
As of 6 December 2010.

Statistics leaders
As of November 29, 2010.

Best 5 matches by ATPWorldTour.com

Point distribution

(ATP World Tour Masters 1000) Qualifying points changes to 12 points only if the main draw is larger than 56
(ATP World Tour 500) Qualifying points changes to 10 points only if the main draw is larger than 32
(ATP World Tour 250) Qualifying points changes to 5 points only if the main draw is larger than 32

Retirements and comebacks

Following is a list of notable players (winners of a main tour title, and/or part of the ATP rankings top 100 (singles) or top 50 (doubles) for at least one week) who announced their retirement from professional tennis during the 2010 season:

  Thierry Ascione (born January 17, 1981, in Villeurbanne, France) turned professional in 2000, reached his career-high singles ranking, no. 81, in 2004. Ascione had his best results on the ATP Challenger Tour, where he collected eight singles titles. He played his last match on the main tour in Metz in September.
  Younes El Aynaoui (born September 12, 1971, in Rabat, Morocco) entered the tour in 1990, and was ranked no. 14 in singles in 2003. He collected five titles on the main circuit, and reached four Grand Slam quarterfinals, at the Australian Open (2000, 2003) and the US Open (2002, 2003). Regularly injured since 2004, El Aynaoui made several comeback attempts before deciding to close his career in Doha in January.
  Guillermo Cañas (born December 25, 1977, in Buenos Aires, Argentina) turned professional in 1995, and peaked no. 8 in singles in 2005 and no. 47 in doubles in 2002. He won seven titles in singles (including the 2002 Toronto Masters), two in doubles, and reached the quarterfinals of the French Open three times (2002, 2005, 2007). Suspended for doping in 2005, Cañas was acquitted in 2006 and returned to the tour in 2007, finishing the year ranked no. 15. He played his last match in the Hamburg qualifying in July 2009.
  Martin Damm (born August 12, 1972, in Liberec, Czech Republic, then Czechoslovakia) joined the circuit in 1990, becoming no. 42 in singles in 1997, and eventually no. 5 in doubles in 2007. Damm won 40 doubles titles during his career, among which four ATP Masters Series titles out of seven finals and one Grand Slam title at the US Open (2006, with Leander Paes) out of three finals. He played his last match in September in New York and started a coaching career with 18-year-old ATP pro Ryan Harrison.
  Taylor Dent (born April 24, 1981, in Newport Beach, United States) became a tennis pro in 1998, and reached his highest singles ranking, no. 21, in 2005. The son of former ATP pro Phil Dent, Taylor Dent collected four singles titles on the main circuit, last playing at the Charlottesville Challenger in November.
  Sébastien Grosjean (born May 29, 1978, in Marseille, France) turned professional in 1996 and peaked at the no. 4 ranking in late 2002, finishing two seasons in the top 10 (2001, 2003). One-time runner-up at the Tennis Masters Cup (2001, lost to Hewitt), Grosjean won four singles and five doubles titles in his career, and made four Grand Slam semifinals, at the Australian Open (2001), at the French Open (2001) and at Wimbledon (2003, 2004). He played his last match in March in Sunrise, and retired during the French Open in May.
  Dominik Hrbatý (born 4 January 1978 in Bratislava, Slovakia) retired after 14 years of professional play citing the reason as being able to spend more time with his family as his wife was due to give birth in December. He was one of the two active players to have a positive win–loss records against Rafael Nadal. He reached the 1999 French Open semifinals only to lose to the eventual champion Andre Agassi. On the team ground, he was more successful, winning the 2005 and 2009 Hopman Cup and reaching the 2005 Davis Cup final as a recurring member of the Slovakia Davis Cup team. The same year he was elected Slovakian sportsman of the year. He peaked the ATP rankings on 12 October 2004. He has six singles career titles.
  Nicolas Kiefer (born July 5, 1977, in Holzminden, Germany, then-West Germany) joined the circuit in 1995, ranking as high as no. 4 in singles in 2000. An Australian Open and US Open boys' singles champion (1995), Kiefer went on to win six singles and three doubles titles on the main tour. In Grand Slams, he reached the quarterfinals at Wimbledon (1997) and the US Open (2000), and the semis in Melbourne (2006). Partnering countryman Rainer Schüttler, Kiefer also took the silver medal in doubles at the 2004 Athens Olympics, losing the final in five sets (lost to González/Massú). Injured during most of 2010, he played his last event in November, in doubles, at an ATP Challenger event in Aachen, Germany.
  Alberto Martín (born August 20, 1978, in Barcelona, Spain) entered the circuit in 1995 and reached his highest ranking, no. 34, in 2001. A French Open junior singles champion in 1996, Martín won three singles and three doubles titles (all on clay courts) on the main tour. He last competed at the Braunschweig Challenger in June.
  Carlos Moyá (born August 26, 1976, in Palma, Majorca, Spain) joined the main tour in 1995, and became the first Spaniard to be ranked world no. 1 on March 15, 1999, holding the position for two weeks. Finishing five seasons within the top 10 (1997–1998, 2002–2004), Moyá went past the fourth round at all Grand Slam tournaments but Wimbledon, his best results being one US Open semifinal (1998), one Australian Open final (1997, lost to Sampras), and one French Open title, his only major victory (1998, def. Corretja). Also a one-time runner-up at the ÀTP Tour World Championships (1998, lost to Corretja), Moyá collected 20 singles titles during his career, among which three ATP Masters Series shields (Monte Carlo (1998), Cincinnati (2002), and Rome (2004)), and was on the team that clinched the Davis Cup trophy in 2004. The Spaniard struggled with a foot injury for more than a year before deciding to retire, playing his last match in Madrid in May. A goodbye ceremony involving Rafael Nadal, Roger Federer, Novak Djokovic, Andy Murray and Andy Roddick was held in November during the ATP World Tour Finals in London.
  Fabrice Santoro (born December 9, 1972, in Tahiti, French Polynesia, France) joined the tour in 1989, and ranked as high as no. 17 in singles in 2001, and no. 6 in doubles in 1999. Junior French Open champion in 1989, Santoro gathered six singles titles, 24 doubles titles, and one mixed doubles title at the French Open (2005, with Daniela Hantuchová) during his pro career. A one-time Grand Slam quarterfinalist in singles at the Australian Open (2006), Santoro reached five major and two year-end championships doubles finals, titling twice in Melbourne (2003, 2004) and once at the Tennis Masters Cup (2005), partnering Michaël Llodra for each win. The Frenchman holds the record for most consecutive appearances in Grand Slam draws (70 from 1998 to 2010), and is the only player to have competed in four different decades (from the 1980s to the 2010s).
  Paradorn Srichaphan (born June 14, 1979, in Khon Kaen, Thailand) joined the professional circuit in 1997, and ranked as high as no. 9 in singles in mid-2003, though he never finished a season within the top 10. Twice a recipient of the Stefan Edberg Sportsmanship Award, Srichaphan titled five times in singles on the main tour. He last competed in a doubles match during the PTT Thailand Open in September 2009. Srichaphan now captains the Thailand Davis Cup team.
  Kevin Ullyett (born May 23, 1972, in Salisbury, Rhodesia (now Harare, Zimbabwe)) came on the tour in 1990, becoming a doubles specialist and peaking at no. 4 in 2005. Ullyett gathered 34 doubles titles during his 19-year career (including five ATP Masters Series titles) and one mixed doubles title at the Australian Open (2002, with Daniela Hantuchová). He won two Grand Slam doubles titles out of three finals, at the US Open (2001) and at the Australian Open (2005), partnering Wayne Black for each win. He last played at Wimbledon in June.
  Mariano Zabaleta (born February 28, 1978, in Tandil, Argentina) joined the tour in 1996 and was ranked no. 21 in singles in 2000. Zabaleta won three singles titles in his career and reached one Grand Slam quarterfinal at the US Open (2001). He last played at the Lima Challenger in November 2009, and officially announced his retirement in May.

Following is a list of notable players (winners of a main tour title, and/or part of the ATP rankings top 100 (singles) or top 50 (doubles) for at least one week) who came out of retirement from professional tennis during the 2010 season:

  Thomas Muster (born October 2, 1967, in Leibnitz, Austria) first joined the tour in 1985 before unofficially retiring in 1999. Ranked world no. 1 for a total of six weeks in 1996, Muster finished five seasons in the top 10 (1990, 1993, 1995–1997), and won 44 singles titles on the main circuit during his career, including eight Super 9 titles and one Grand Slam trophy at the French Open (1995, def. Chang). Muster returned this year on the ATP Challenger Tour, playing his first pro match in ten years in Braunschweig in June. He entered several Challenger events during the rest of the season, making one main tour appearance at the Vienna 250 event. Muster finished the season ranked 980 in singles.
  Sándor Noszály (born March 16, 1972, in Budapest, Hungary) joined the ATP Challenger Tour in 1989 both in singles and doubles at the age of 17. In 1995 he reached the quarterfinal of 1995 Austrian Open losing to Thomas Muster and the semifinal of 1995 Romanian Open losing again to the Austrian. Thus he became ranked no. 95 in the world. The same year—maturing from being the youngest member ever (16 ages old) of the Davis Cup team—he pushed Hungary to the World Group for the second time (1993) after beating former champions Australia in the play-off. He returned to international tennis in the 2010 Sarasota Open after a 7-year gap competing only in the unofficial non-ATP event Hungarian National Tennis Championships, which he had won 16 times.

See also
2010 WTA Tour
2010 ATP Challenger Tour
2010 ITF Women's Circuit
Association of Tennis Professionals
International Tennis Federation

Notes

 Robin Söderling won the final after Mikhail Youzhny retired because of a right hamstring injury.
 Daniel Nestor and Nenad Zimonjić won the final after Mahesh Bhupathi and Max Mirnyi were forced to retire because of a left leg injury contracted by Bhupathi.
 Albert Montañés won the final after Gaël Monfils retired because of a right ankle injury.
 Dustin Brown decided to play under the German flag starting in October – he was still representing Jamaica when he won the Metz doubles in September.

References
General

Specific

External links
Association of Tennis Professionals (ATP) World Tour official website
International Tennis Federation (ITF) official website

 
ATP World Tour
ATP Tour seasons